Maria Louise Newman (born January 18, 1962) is an American composer of classical music, violinist and pianist. She is the youngest child of Alfred Newman, a major Hollywood film composer. Maria holds the Louis and Annette Kaufman Composition Chair; and the Joachim Chassman Violin Chair at the Montgomery Arts House for Music and Architecture in Malibu, California, and is a founder of the Malibu Friends of Music. Her library of original works represents a range of genres, from large-scale orchestral works, works for the ballet, chamber works, choral and vocal works, to new collaborative scores for vintage silent film. She has been presented with many awards and commissions, including musical commendations from the United States Congress (2009), the California State Senate (2009), the California State Assembly (2009), the City of Malibu (2010), and the Annenberg Foundation (2011).

Life and career
The youngest of the children of nine-time Academy Award-winning composer/conductor Alfred Newman and former Goldwyn Girl and businesswoman Martha Louis Montgomery, Maria Newman is part of the musical Hollywood Newman family dynasty. Her father, Alfred Newman, (1900-1970), was the conductor of the original Hollywood Bowl Orchestra. Her family was of Jewish background.

Newman grew up in Pacific Palisades, California and began studying piano at age six. At age eight, she started a lifelong tie to the violin and was composing by age nine. As a teenager, Newman studied with violinist Joachim Chassman, who was a founding member of the Hollywood String Quartet, and played in the 20th Century Fox Studio Orchestra under Alfred Newman (composer).

After high school, Newman entered the University of Rochester's Eastman School of Music in Rochester, NY, where she studied violin with Peter Salaff  of the Cleveland Quartet, and piano with Blair Cosman, graduating in 1984, and earning a Bachelor of Music (BM '84) with high honors (Magna cum laude). Also in 1984, Newman was inducted into the American Academic Honor Society, Pi Kappa Lambda. Newman attended Yale University from 1984 to 1986, completing graduate work there, studying violin with Syoko Aki, and composition with Martin Bresnick. She earned a Master of Music Degree (MM '86), and received Yale School of Music's George Wellington Miles Award. In addition to her active career as a composer, and performing her own works in concert, Maria Newman has collaborated as a soloist with celebrities Pierce Brosnan, Billy Crystal, Paul Reiser, Randy Newman, and Daniel Stern. Her works have been performed in such novel locations as the U. S, Capitol Building, Hearst Castle Private Theatre, Washington State Capitol Building Rotunda, The National Archives, the Kennedy Center, and the U.S. Marine Barracks, among others.

Newman and her husband, Scott Hosfeld, who is the Founding Conductor/Music Director of the Malibu Coast Chamber Orchestra, currently live in Malibu, California. They are raising five children: Martha Jeannette Thatcher (b. 1996), Isabella Montgomery Thatcher (b. 1998), Samuel (Sonny) James Thatcher (b. 2000), Noah Louis Hosfeld (b. 2005), and Joaquin Syrus Hosfeld (b. 2008).

Family and renowned siblings

Maria is the youngest child of Martha Louis Montgomery (born December 5, 1920, Clarksdale, Mississippi - died May 9, 2005, Pacific Palisades, California), a former John Robert Powers model, actress, benefactor and Goldwyn Girl, and 9-time Academy Award-winning film composer, Alfred Newman (composer). Maria Newman has four older siblings: Thomas Newman, David Newman, Fred Newman, Lucy Newman Whiffen. She has one half brother, Tim Newman.

Maria is from a large family of major Hollywood film composers:

Her older brother David Newman has scored nearly 100 films, including Hoffa, Galaxy Quest, The Nutty Professor, The War of the Roses, and Ice Age.
Her second older brother Thomas Newman has scored over 75 films, including Finding Nemo, The Green Mile, The Shawshank Redemption, Fried Green Tomatoes, Road to Perdition, American Beauty, and WALL-E, and has received twelve Academy Award nominations.
Her first cousin, Randy Newman is a two-time Academy Award-winner noted not only for his film work, but also for a series of popular albums as a singer/songwriter, including Toy Story, Toy Story 2, and Toy Story 3.
Her cousin Joey Newman has scored many TV series, films, and video games.
Her niece Jaclyn Newman Dorn is a music editor, and won a Golden Reel Award for 30 Days of Night: Dark Days, and received another nomination for Burlesque.
Her uncle Lionel Newman scored three dozen films and several TV series, adapting and conducting scores for hundreds of other films.
Her uncle Emil Newman scored over 80 films.

Composition career

Newman is an Annenberg Foundation Composition Fellow, and received a grant from the foundation in 2012.

As a violinist who performs and records around the world, Maria Newman began her professional composition career using a pseudonym. "I was terribly worried that I would not be taken seriously as a female composer in what I felt was a highly male-dominated field. My famous family's film musician genealogy also put the notion into my mind that I would not be accepted, much less respected, in the concert music world as a serious composer." Newman used the name, M. Louis Parker, the name of her maternal great-grandmother, feeling that the name neither indicated that she was a Newman, nor a woman. In 1991, Newman began using her own name as a composer. Newman studied composition briefly with Martin Bresnick, at Yale University, though she received both her BM and MM in Violin Performance. To date, Newman's original music library consists of over 150 concert works.

Icicle Creek Music Center
In the Summer of 1995, Newman was appointed Composer-in-Residence for the Icicle Creek Music Center in Leavenworth, Washington. She held the post until the end of the 2004 summer season.

Montgomery Arts House for Music and Architecture and Malibu Friends of Music
As Composer-in-Residence at the Montgomery Arts House for Music and Architecture (MAHMA), a modern craftsman venue in Malibu, California, designed by Eric Lloyd Wright of the Frank Lloyd Wright family of architects, Newman participates in 40-plus concerts annually in this venue alone. Her duties at MAHMA include Composer-in-Residence for the Malibu Coast Chamber Orchestra, Malibu Madrigals, the Malibu Coast Silent Film Orchestra, Malibu Coast String Quartet, the Malibu Ocast Chamber Ballet, and the Malibu Coast Chamber Orchestra Solisti. Newman has held the Louis and Annette Kaufman Composition Chair and the Joachim Chassman Violin Chair at the Montgomery Arts House for Music and Architecture (MAHMA) and the Malibu Friends of Music since 2005.

Newman's achievement at MAHMA is the story of a dedicated classical musician, who, through perseverance, dedication and the belief that music is a highly powerful community-wide healing mechanism, is offering music and music making on an intimate level. Newman has a gift of making audiences feel valued and she effortlessly gains their trust. It is important to Newman that the musicians are happy as well. Says Newman, "I feel that at MAHMA we are in a place where dear friends gather to rehearse, perform, listen, experience, eat, laugh, and discuss music and art in depth. The level of music-making here is extraordinarily high and truly rare for a small town, as we bring in wonderful guest artists and speakers from around the world to collaborate with our outstanding group of resident artists. The entire experience at MAHMA is marvelously satisfying." In addition, Newman tours frequently as featured composer, performer, lecturer and master teacher.

According to critic Jim Svejda, "Maria Newman is hugely musical, bewitching, profound and playful with an instantly recognizable and unusually appealing musical personality."

Viklarbo Chamber Ensemble
Along with pianist/longtime musical partner, Wendy Prober, Newman founded the Viklarbo Chamber Ensemble in 1987.  With Viklarbo, Newman and Prober have concertized in this country's most prestigious concert halls, as well as for some of the poorest communities in the United States. The ensemble has been awarded grants from the National Endowment for the Arts (NEA), the City of Los Angeles Cultural Affairs Department, the California Arts Council, the Utah Tour for the Performing Arts, the Delta Arts Council, the Headwaters Council for the Arts, Hawaii Council for the Arts, and many others. The ensemble continues to present concerts today. Newman serves as Composer-in-Residence for the ensemble.

Guest residencies
Newman has been guest composer for Los Angeles Mozart Orchestra, Solisti New York, Brevard Symphony Orchestra, San Jose Chamber Orchestra, New West Symphony, Olympia Chamber Orchestra, Wichita Symphony, Los Angeles Jewish Symphony, Santa Monica Symphony, Pacific Serenades, Martha's Vineyard Chamber Music Society, Chamber Music Palisades, Dorian Festival Chamber Orchestra at Luther College, Omaha Conservatory Festival and Cinema Orchestras, Azusa Pacific Grand Orchestra Festival, Central Washington University Symphony Orchestra, Orchestra Omaha, Wonder of Words Festival (WOW!), Northwestern University, Indiana University, Bloomington, School of Music Philharmonic Orchestra, and more.

Performance career

A bold and versatile performer, Newman's performances of both her works and  traditional masterworks are consistently programmed in concert halls and heard regularly on radio broadcasts and on television worldwide. In her role as violinist, violist and pianist, Maria Newman has concertized around the world as a soloist, recitalist, and as a member of the Malibu Coast String Quartet and the Viklarbo Chamber Ensemble. As a concert soloist, Newman has also premiered many new works for violin, as well as for viola (including many of her own) in some of the United States and Europe. She was the viola soloist for the Grammy Award-winning album, "Symphonic Hollywood", in  Miklos Rozsa's "Viola Concerto" with the Nuremberg Symphony. Newman performed the U.S. premiere of Miklos Rozsa's Violin Concerto No. 1 with the St. Matthew's Chamber Orchestra, as well as the premiere recording of Rozsa's Introduction and Allegro for Solo Viola.

Ms. Newman has collaborated in concert as soloist with celebrities Pierce Brosnan, Billy Crystal, Paul Reiser and Daniel Stern, and has performed as a featured soloist at the United States Capitol Building Complex on Capitol Hill in Washington D.C., headlining a Special Event representing the highly debated Victim's Rights Bill. Newman has been featured as commissioned composer and performer in the Private Theatre inside the Historic Hearst Castle in San Simeon, California, introduced by William Randolph Hearst III.

Selected works
This is only a list of selected works.

String Quartet
String Quartet No.1, Opus 33, No. 7 "Birthday of the Infanta" (1995)
1. The Party – Carneval

2. The Bull Fight
3. The Dance of the Dwarf
4. The Forest and the Minuet
5. The Search and the Mirror
6. Finale: The Death of the Dwarf
String Quartet No.2, Opus 35, No. 1 "Lauds" (1998)
1. Maestoso feroce - Allegro
2. Poco andante – poco allegro
3. Stiltedly swaying, moderato
4. Intermezzo: Allegro molto
5. Finale: Allegro molto

Piano
Sonata for Piano, Opus 32, No. 6 "Maskil" (1994)
I. Largo-Presto
II. Andante Iontano
III. Allegro assai
The Complete Ballet Music for Two Pianos, Opus 39, No. 1 "Emma McChesney" (2002)
I. Moderato-Feroce (The Traveling Saleswoman)
II. Moderato, molto legato (Emma Tells of Her Life)
III. Andantino melancholica (The Robbery)
IV. Feroce, accented (Mad Dance Lessons with Jock)

Song Cycles for Voice & Mixed Ensembles/Orchestra
"A Breath of Mississippi," Opus 43, No. 5 Song Cycle for Soprano, Two Violins and Piano (2005)
(On the poetry of Louise Moss Montgomery)
I. Little Songs
II. Watchword
III. Under the Oak Tree
IV. My Auntie Mother
V. That's Home
"Songs on Motherhood," Opus 36, No. 2 Song Cycle for Soprano (or Mezzo Soprano), Violin, Clarinet (or Viola, and Harp (or Piano) (1998)
(On poetry of Louise Moss Montgomery) 
I. To a Refractory Father
II. Jeu, Intermede 1
III. Pirouetting
IV. Jeu, Intermede 2
V. Do Not Stand at My Grave and Weep (anonymous poetry)
"Montgomery Carols, Set 1," Opus 39 No. 1 For SATB and Mixed Chamber Ensemble (2001) 
(On poetry of Maria Newman) 
I. Ring Your Bells
II. Baby Lord of Majesty
III. Little Saviour of Healing Light
"Shirat Hayam," Opus 44 No. 4 For Tenor Voice (or Baritone) and String Orchestra/Harp OR Tenor Voice (or Baritone) and Piano Quintet OR Tenor Voice (or Baritone) and Piano (2006) 
I. Extol I
II. Extol II

Flute with Mixed Chamber Ensembles
Pennipotenti, Opus 42, No. 1 (2005)
I. The Dipper
II. The Snowy Owl
III. The Humming Bird
IV. The Falcon
Sonata for Flute & Piano in the Style of the Harpsichord, Opus 44, No. 7 (1999)
I. Misterioso, tiptoeing
II. With virtuosic flourish (flute alone)
III. Molto allegro possible
IV. Largo
V. Presto
"The Pied Piper of Haemlin", Opus 47, No. 9 (2008)
I. Reverie 1 (flute alone)
II. Scene 1
III. Reverie 2 (flute alone)
IV. Scene 2
V.Reverie 3 (flute alone)
VI. Scene 3
VII. Reverie 4
VIII. Scene 4
Colores de Mexico, Opus 44, No. 8 (2007)
I. The Rain (La Lluvia)
II. The Rattlesnake (La Culebra)
III. The River (El Rio)
IV. The Coyote (El Coyote)
V. A Little Dance (Un Pequeno Baile)

Concerti for Solo Instruments & String Orchestra
Cello Concerto, Opus 40, No. 6 (2002)
I. Largo, poco intensivo
II. Allegro molto
III. Cadenza
IV. Come prima, ma piu intensivo
(all movements attacca)

Othmar, Sonata for cello alone (2000) 
Viola Concerto, Opus 45, No. 10 (2006)
I. Cadenza
II. Chorale -Allegro
(all movements attacca)
Violin Concerto, Opus 38, No. 7 "Lux Aeterna" (2001)
I. Feroce Maestoso - Allegro
Triple Violin Concerto, Opus 41, No. 4 "Trinitas et Unitas" (2003)
I. Trinitas
II Unitas (with soprano solo)

String Orchestra
Concerto Grosso, Opus 34, No. 4 (1996)
For String Orchestra
I. Feroce maestoso - Allegro
II. Quasi adagio ma non tanto, lontano
III. Allegro energico
"Le Livre D'Esther", Opus 38, No. 2 (2009)
("The Book of Esther")
I. The Purification
II. Mordecai
III. The Decrees of Esther
IV. Purim

String Duo
Appalachian Duets, Opus 38, No. 8 (2001)
 For Two Violins
I. Heart O' the Hills
II. Goin' Fishin
III. The Train
IV. Mammy's Little Lullaby
V. Granpap's Fiddle

Large Brass Ensemble
Chorales for Brass and Percussion, Opus 35, No. 3 (1997, revised 2002)
I. Chorale
II. Dance
III. Dirge
IV. Finale

Filmography & commissions

Library of Vintage Silent Films 

Maria Newman has been commissioned to score a revision of Vintage Silent Films by the following organizations: The Annenberg Foundation, The Mary Pickford Foundation, Viklarbo Chamber Ensemble, The Malibu Friends of Music, Timeline Films, Luther College Dorian Festival, Omaha Conservatory of Music, Icicle Creek Music Center, Central Washington University, The Family of Mary Lofdahl, Milestone Films, A&F Productions, The Sierra Festival Symphony, Grand Performances Los Angeles, and Turner Classic Movies including the movie, "Mr. Wu" starring Lon Chaney (1927).

A list of these films include:

Additional Commissions in the Press

October 26, 2012: WOW! Wonder of the Words Festival (wonderofwordsfest.com), The Kate Shelley Story - featuring Marian Newman's original music, based on the story written by Mary Kay Shanley..."is the story of a young Iowa girl that has captured the attention of Iowans for decades…"The live mixed-media performance will showcase an original narrate and retelling of The Kate Shelley Story penned by best-selling author Mary Kay Shanley; an original musical score written and conducted by award-winning composer and virtuosic violinist Maria Newman, and the highly acclaimed federated actress with the Repertory Theatre of Iowa Allisa Schetter-Siedschlaw will play the role of Kate. The performance will be directed by Des Moines Social Club Artistic Director Matthew McIver…"

July 25, 2012: "...Barak, a neoclassicist with four pieces in the New York City Ballet repertory, is creating an 11-minute ballet to a score by Los Angeles composer Maria Newman (of the Oscar-winning, film-composer Newman family)...." (National Choreographers Initiative a lab for ballet at UC Irvine, By Laura Bleiberg, Special to the Los Angeles Times, July 25, 2012)

December 16, 2009: Composer Maria Newman conducting a live chamber orchestra to her original score for the fully restored Mary Pickford silent film classic, "Daddy Long Legs," hosted by Pickford Foundation curator Hugh Munro Neely.

August 12, 2009: "Winston's family has donated the film projection equipment for the screening of "The Terminator" and for future Malibu Film Society screenings, which include a fully restored Blu-ray print of 1948 Academy Award winner "The Red Shoes;" Woody Allen's Oscar-winner "Annie Hall;" last year's "Waltz with Bashir," the Israeli animated documentary about the 1982 Lebanon War; and the 1919 silent film, "Daddy-Long-Legs," starring Mary Pickford, which will feature a chamber orchestra conducted by Maria Newman."

Educational activities

Newman presents masterclasses, coaches student performances of her original compositions and others, and lectures at universities and many arts organizations nationwide.

Awards and recognition

Newman has recognition and commendations from the Annenberg Foundation, the United States Congress, the California State Senate, the California State Assembly, the County of Los Angeles, the City of Malibu, and The Malibu Times newspaper. Newman has appeared in subject spotlight articles by noted and esteemed newspapers and magazines. She received a Malibu Music Award for "Classical Artist of the Year", a "Variety Composer Legend" Award, a "Debut Award" from the Los Angeles "Young Musicians' Foundation," the California Arts Commission. Newman's works are featured on private and public radio, as well as on Turner Broadcasting.

 Annenberg Foundation Composition and Performance Fellowship, 2011
 Mary Pickford Foundation Composition Fellowship, 2011 and 2012
 Omaha Institute Residency Composition Fellowship and Commission, 2011
 City of Malibu Commission, Recognition and Commendation, 2010
 Recognition and Commendation from the United States Congress, 2009
 Recognition and Commendation from the California State Senate, 2009
 Recognition and Commendation from the California State Assembly, 2009
 Recognition and Commendation from the City of Malibu, 2009
 "Classical Artist of the Year" Malibu Music Awards, 2008
 The Malibu Times 2008 Citizens of the Year Dolphin Awards
 "Composer Legend of the Year" Variety Magazine, 1997
 California Arts Council Composer Fellowship, 2002
 Mary Pickford Foundation Grants, 1997, 1999, 2000, 2008, 2011

Recordings

Newman's works have been performed and recorder by cellist Andrew Shulman, violist Paul Coletti, double bassist Nico Abondolo, artist Randy Newman, flutist Hal Ott, and pianists Wendy Prober, Delores Stevens, Peter Longworth, Bryan Pezzone, Kairos String Quartet, and Malibu String Quartet.

A list of her recorded works on the Montgomery Arts House Masterworks Recording label is as follows:
Maria Newman: REQUIEM for the Innocents;
Maria Newman: The Art of the Chamber Orchestra Books, I, II, & III;
Maria Newman: Music for String Quartet, Book I;
Maria Newman: Music for Cello, Book I;
Maria Newman: Malibu Chamber Players - Pennipotenti;
Maria Newman: Spooky Sonorities;
Maria Newman: Dynamic Duos & Obscure Fantasy Heroes, Book I;
Maria Newman: A Scented Garden of Music - "Melodies of the South," Book I;
Maria Newman: Music for Piano, Book I;
Maria Newman: A Holiday Festival of Music & Light - Myth, Mystery & Mysticism;
Maria Newman: Music for Violin, Book I

Recorded clips of Maria Newman's work and selected public performances are available on YouTube.

References

External link

1962 births
American classical composers
American classical violinists
American classical violists
Women violists
American women classical composers
American film score composers
American people of Russian-Jewish descent
Eastman School of Music alumni
Living people
Musicians from Los Angeles
Maria
People from Pacific Palisades, California
Classical musicians from California
21st-century classical violinists
21st-century American women musicians
Women classical violinists
21st-century American violinists
21st-century violists